George John Godolphin Spencer-Churchill, Marquess of Blandford (born 28 July 1992), styled as Earl of Sunderland until 2014, is a British aristocrat and polo player. He is a model and brand ambassador for La Martina, an Argentinean polo clothing and accessories company. As the heir apparent to the Dukedom of Marlborough, he uses the courtesy title of Marquess of Blandford.

Early life and family
He is the son of Jamie Spencer-Churchill, 12th Duke of Marlborough and his first wife, Rebecca Mary Few Brown. He is also a descendant of Consuelo Vanderbilt (first wife of the 9th Duke of Marlborough).

He and his family are notable for being involved in a high-profile legal dispute around 1993, when his paternal grandfather (the 11th Duke of Marlborough) sought to disinherit Lord Blandford's father. Since his father has had a controversial past, including serving time in jail for forging prescriptions and road rage, Lord Blandford was announced as the financial beneficiary of his grandfather's estate. His inheritance was to include Blenheim Palace, a 187-room mansion set in 2,000 acres in Oxfordshire.

Education and career
He was educated at Harrow School, where he was captain of the school's polo team. From 2011 to 2014, he attended University College London, where he studied town planning.

In 2015, he started working as an aviation broker at JLT Group in London. In 2019, he became a broker at the London office of Arthur J. Gallagher & Co., an American insurance brokerage.

Other activities
He began serving as a model and brand ambassador for the La Martina brand of polo clothes and accessories in 2015. His "Blenheim Polo Team" plays at Cirencester Park Polo Club in Gloucestershire.

From December 2018 to January 2019, he and three friends successfully rowed across the Atlantic Ocean in a time of 35 days, finishing second in the 2018 Talisker Whisky Atlantic Challenge.  He helped raise over £850,000 for the Starlight children's charity in the process.

Marriage and issue
Lord Blandford married Camilla Elizabeth Antonia Thorp (now styled as Marchioness of Blandford)(b. 7 April 1987), a descendant of the Tempest baronets of Tong, Yorkshire, on 8 September 2018 at St Mary Magdalene Church, Woodstock. Attendees of the wedding included Lady Violet Manners, Lord and Lady Bamford, Andrew Parker-Bowles, and Lord Milford Haven. They have a daughter, Lady Olympia Arabella Kitty Spencer-Churchill (born 10 September 2020).

References

1992 births
Living people
People educated at Harrow School
Alumni of University College London
Blandford
George
Vanderbilt family
English polo players
British polo players
Cadogan family